Robert Ouko may refer to:

 Robert Ouko (politician) (1931–1990), Foreign Minister of Kenya
 Robert Ouko (athlete) (1948–2019), Kenyan athlete